Azzo VIII d'Este (died 31 January 1308) was lord of Ferrara, Modena and Reggio from 1293 until his death.

He inherited the family lands from his father, Obizzo II, whom Dante suggested in the Inferno he had assassinated. The Florentine poet cites him as half-son, but it is not clear if to stress Azzo's bad acts or if he was truly illegitimate. The early part of his rule was spent in almost continuous warfare: war with Padua at his accession and with Parma and Bologna in 1295–1299. He was accused of the assassination of the podestà of Bologna, Jacopo del Cassero, who had opposed the Este expansion plans.

The marriage bargain he struck with Charles II of Naples for his youngest daughter, Beatrice, was notorious in his day and among chroniclers afterwards: Dante asserted that Charles "was seen to sell his own daughter and to bargain over her as corsairs do over slaves." The nuptial agreement survives in the Este archives: Azzo granted his father-in-law 51,000 florins, to be invested in lands in the Regno and in appropriate places in the marquisate of Este, and promised to establish primogeniture in the Este holdings, contrary in fact to Estense traditions, and explicitly disinheriting Azzo's brother Francesco. The wedding was solemnized. Modena and Reggio rebelled in 1306 over an attempt to assign them to Beatrice as part of the bride price, a custom that had been superseded in Italy by the dowry.

Francesco d'Este left Ferrara as Beatrice arrived and joined the coalition of cities that moved against Azzo in 1306, determined that he should not make himself lord of Lombardy.

References

Sources
 

13th-century births
1308 deaths
House of Este
Italian assassins
13th-century Italian nobility
14th-century Italian nobility
Medieval assassins
13th-century murderers